Kozhayevo is a rural locality (a village) in Krasnopolyanskoye Rural Settlement, Nikolsky District, Vologda Oblast, Russia. The population was 347 as of 2002. There are 10 streets.

Geography 
Kozhayevo is located 8 km southeast of Nikolsk (the district's administrative centre) by road. Dor is the nearest rural locality.

References 

Rural localities in Nikolsky District, Vologda Oblast